Khasarwara is a village in Sarojaninagar block of Lucknow district, Uttar Pradesh, India. As of 2011, its population was 1,314, in 259 households. It is the seat of a gram panchayat, which also includes the village of Dhaavaapur.

References 

Villages in Lucknow district